Ganesh Jain  is a Bollywood film producer. He, along with his brothers, Ratan Jain, Girish Jain, Champak Jain, Umed Jain, Ramesh Jain and Bhawar Jain, founded the company Venus Records & Tapes. Major films he has produced include Baazigar,Josh, Garam Masala, Aap Ki Khatir and De Dana Dan. He was elected as chairman of the Indian Music Industry (IMI).

Career
Ganesh Jain along with his brother Ratan Jain started the business of manufacturing video cassettes during the early 1980s under the banner of Venus Records & Tapes Manufacturing Company. In 1992 they diversified their business by starting to produce films. The first film produced was Khiladi. The company in past two decades has amassed many audio, satellite, video and cable rights.

Filmography

Films

Web series

References

Hindi film producers
Living people
Year of birth missing (living people)

tum:A Dangerous Obsession